Kuruçay, Çubuk is a village in the District of Çubuk, Ankara Province, Turkey. As of 2014 it had a population of 844 people.

History 
Its initial name was Uluçay and changed to Kuruçay as a result of the mutual discussion of the villages Hızır and Hacı Ahmet Efendi. There are some relics from the Ottoman period in the village; it has a castle from the same time period with a height of 1850 m (6070 ft).

Population

References

Villages in Çubuk District